C22orf15 (Chromosome 22 Open Reading Frame 15) is a protein which, in humans, is encoded by the C22orf15 gene.

Gene
The locus of C22orf15 in humans is on the long arm (q) of chromosome 22 in region 11, band 23 (22q11.23); it spans 3,340 base pairs on the plus strand from base pair 23,762,523 to 23,765,863 and contains ten introns and six exons.

Transcripts
C22orf15 is transcribed into 23 transcripts in Homo sapiens.

Promoter
C22orf15 has two upstream promoter regions. GXP_9794292 is 1040 base pairs in length spanning from base pair 23,758,601 to 23,759,640 on chromosome 22, while GXP_6747563 is 1740 base pairs spanning from base pair 23,761,523 to 23,763,262. The transcription start region is located at base pair 23,762,523.

Post-translational modifications
The post-translational modifications of C22orf15, which include phosphorylation, O-GlcNAcylation, and SUMOylation, are annotated on the conceptual translation.

Structure 
C22orf15 in humans is 148 amino acids in length. The molecular weight of human C22orf15 is 17 kdal, and the isoelectric point is 9.0. C22orf15 does not have any unusually high or low amino acid compositions compared to other proteins in humans.

 

The interleukin 2 receptor subunit gamma (II2rg) domain, which spans from amino acids 2-102 in C22orf15, facilitates the creation of the common gamma chain protein. This protein is a component of various receptors that aid in immune system function. These receptors direct and regulate the growth of lymphocytes, T cells, B cells, and natural killer cells, which promote immune response.

Secondary 
The protein structure prediction tool I-TASSER predicts C22orf15 to have both an alpha helical and beta strand structure; there are three disordered regions present in the protein.

Tissue distribution 
C22orf15 is ubiquitously expressed at a low level with some variability among tissues. C22orf15 is expressed highest in the adrenal glands, salivary glands, trachea, heart, spinal cord, and skeletal muscle tissues.  

In an anti-C22orf15 antibody produced in rabbits, immunochemical staining shows strong cytoplasmic positivity in the glandular cells of the human colon.

Subcellular distribution 
C22orf15 is localized in both the nucleus and cytoplasm. Antibody staining of glandular cells in the human colon shows strong cytoplasmic positivity. However, as seen on the conceptual translation, C22orf15 has conserved nuclear localization signals that would suggest nuclear localization as well.

Homology
Orthologous sequences to C22orf15 in humans are found in mammals, aves, reptiles, amphibians, and fishes as seen in the C22orf15 orthologs table. C22orf15 has no paralogs and is not present in invertebrates (Porifera, Platyhelminthes, Nematoda, Annelida, Echinodermata, Mollusca, Arthropoda), fungi, or bacteria; the gene appears to have originated in cartilaginous fishes approximately 473 million years ago.

Evolution

The slope of the trendline for C22orf15 more closely resembles the slope of the trendline for fibrinogen alpha chain, which evolves rapidly, as opposed to the slope of the trendline for cytochrome c, which evolves slowly. This signifies that C22orf15 is evolving rapidly, but not as rapidly as fibrinogen alpha chain.

Clinical Significance
There appears to be a linkage between C22orf15 and both gastric and breast cancers. A copy number loss of DNA region 22q11.23, which includes C22orf15, has been linked to chromosomal instability (CIN)-positive aneuploid gastric cancer.  DNA region 22q11.23 is also significantly more prevalent in basal-like BRCA1-mutated tumors compared to nonmutated wild-type BRCA1 tumors. Additionally, C22orf15 is highly differentially expressed in breast cancer cells compared to unaffected mammary epithelial cells. 

Tetralogy of Fallot, a birth defect that alters normal blood flow through the heart, is a disease associated with C22orf15. 
 Survival rate of Nasopharyngeal carcinoma has been found to negatively correlate with the expression of six specific genes, including C22orf15. C22orf15 has also been identified as one of the 40 novel protein biomarkers that are risk factors for incident atrial fibrillation.

Genetics
Phenotypes of patients with C22orf15 copy-number variants include intellectual disability, micrognathia, ventricular septal defect, and Tetralogy of Fallot.

References